Pseudohomaloptera leonardi is a species of the genus Pseudohomaloptera in the family Balitoridae. It inhabits the South-East region of Asia.

References

Balitoridae
Fish described in 1941